OpeniBoot is an open source implementation of Apple's closed source bootloader iBoot. It allows the booting of unsigned code on supported iDevices (such as Linux kernels). It also allows to download and install the Android operating system on iPhone, iPad and iPod Touch. It can be controlled via OpeniBoot console (oibc) which can be connected to from a libusb enabled computer.

Supported devices
 the following iDevices are fully supported by OpeniBoot:
 iPhone - (iPhone1,1)
 iPhone 3G - (iPhone1,2)
 iPod Touch - 1st Generation (iPod1,1)

Porting status
 these are the status of ports for various iDevices.
iPhone - Fully supported
iPhone 3G - Fully supported
iPhone 3GS - Partially Supported
iPhone 4 (GSM) - Partially Supported
iPhone 4 (CDMA) - Partially Supported
IPod Touch (original) - Fully Supported
iPod Touch 2G - Partially Supported
iPod Touch 3G - Not Supported, Waiting For Port
iPod Touch 4G - Partially Supported
iPad - Partially Supported

See also 
 Linux on Apple devices

References

IPhone
Boot loaders